Iration is a reggae/pop group from Santa Barbara, California. All members originally hail from Hawaii. They play a mix of reggae, dub, pop, and rock. The group is one of the leading bands in the genre of sunshine reggae.

History

Formation and New Roots EP (2006)

Iration began in Isla Vista, an unincorporated community connected to UC Santa Barbara, playing reggae covers in college towns such as Cal Poly SLO, Chico State, and UC Davis. They recorded an EP, New Roots, in 2006, and built a reputation for their live performance, according to the Santa Barbara Independent: "There's something to be said for any band that can capture the undivided attention of a crowd full of drunken Isla Vistans, especially when there are kegs to be tapped and cops to avoid. But roots reggae rockers Iration manage to 'do it' on a regular basis."

No Time To Rest album (2007)
In 2007, they recorded and released their first full-length album, No Time for Rest, which topped the Billboard Reggae Albums Chart, and a single, "Cookie Jar", reached number one in Hawaii on 93.9 DaBeat and was featured on Fuel TV’s Triple Crown of Surfing recap.

Sample This EP (2008)

In 2008, Iration embarked on their first national tour, opening for Pepper.

On October 3, 2008, Iration released their second EP, Sample This, which debuted as the #3 top-selling reggae album world-wide on iTunes.

Time Bomb (2010) and Fresh Grounds EP (2011)

They released their second album, Time Bomb, in March 2010, which also topped the Billboard Reggae Albums Chart and sold over 36,000 copies.

In the week of February 19, 2011, Iration's third EP, Fresh Grounds hit #147 on the "Billboard" magazine's Albums list. They were featured as #1 on the magazine's Heatseekers albums list for the week of February 19, 2011

Automatic and Touring (2013)

In early 2013, after extensive U.S. touring Iration announced they had finished recording a new full length album titled Automatic 
The album was released in July 2013, sold more than 8,000 copies in its first week of release, and topped the Billboard Reggae Albums Chart. Cage The Elephant guitarist Lincoln Parish is featured on numerous songs, as well as helping produce the upcoming album.

Kai's departure and Hotting Up (2013–2015)
On April 5, 2013, Iration announced that vocalist Kai Rediske had quit the band. While Iration's official announcement of this via their own website stated Kai left to "pursue other interests." People that have knowledge of the group dynamic have stated that Kai's marriage, and unwillingness to be a part of extensive future touring as a result played a factor.

The band's fourth album, Hotting Up was released in August 2015, just as the first three albums had, topped the Billboard Reggae Albums chart.

Double Up acoustic album (2016)
On December 2, 2016, Iration released Double Up, an acoustic album. It featured songs from the band's entire catalog of music. They "stripped them back and gave them an alternate life. We thought about a wave doubling up and the fact that it's another version of the same entity." The album reached #2 on the Billboard Reggae Albums chart.

Self-titled album (2018)
Iration recorded a self-titled album, their sixth studio album, which was released on May 18, 2018. The band collaborated with reggae artists: J Boog, Slightly Stoopid and Tyrone's Jacket, and featured 16 tracks. The album peaked on the Billboard Reggae Album chart at No. 2, the Independent Albums chart at No. 14 and made it onto the Billboard 200 at No. 199.

Coastin (2020)
On March 9, 2020, the band announced their seventh studio album, titled Coastin', alongside a promotional tour in the "Coastin' Summer Tour", set to feature roots reggae artist Tribal Seeds. Due to the COVID-19 pandemic, however, they were forced to postpone the tour. The album featured tracks with Common Kings, Eli Mac, Eric Rachmany of Rebelution and Stick Figure.

On March 13, 2021, Iration announced a dub version of Coastin on their Facebook page. The 7-song EP features dub remixes of Coastin tracks and will be out on vinyl all digital platforms on May 7, 2021.

On May 22, 2021, Iration was one of many selected reggae bands featured on Collie Buddz second riddim album, Cali Roots Riddim 2021 with their single, "Be Alright".

On November 18, 2022, Iration released their first 'official' live album, titled Backyard Sessions: Malibu Edition, on all digital platforms. They recorded this album last year during the coronavirus pandemic outside overlooking the Pacific Ocean in Malibu, California. It was originally for their first live stream on NoCap Shows, but decided to make a live album instead.

Awards and honors
On July 29, 2021, Iration announced on their social media platforms that their 2010 song "Time Bomb" is officially RIAA Gold certified. To celebrate this milestone, they launched a new merch collection and partnered with Sweet.io to bring you the band's first official NFT.

Other projects
Iration teamed up with Arrow Lodge Brewing in Covina, California to brew a special beer and 40-ounce can. Named after the band's 2020 song "Chill Out" from their Coastin album, this IPA was brewed with bird pick tea for a tropical taste.

Iration also collaborated with MERGE4 to create special pairs of socks featuring artwork from the band's album catalog. The socks are available in Iration's online merch store on their website.

Playing as much golf as possible while not on tour, Iration teamed up with Seamus Golf of Beaverton, Oregon on a hademade collaboration. The limited edition and quantities golf collection features a custom-made Oil Can Ball Mark with the diamond Iration logo in metal that creates tan, bronze, purple and blue hues; a hand-crafted waterproof military-grade Cordura head cover with an embroidered full-color Iration logo and lined with black fleece. Also included is the band's custom black polo shirt as a bundle for a discounted price.

Lineup

Current members
Micah Pueschel ("The Rainbow Road Warrior") – lead vocals, guitar (2004–present)
Adam Taylor – bass (2004–present)
Cayson Peterson – keyboards/synthesizer (2004–present)
Joseph Dickens ("The D") – drums (2004–present)
Micah Brown – lead guitar, vocals (2014–present)
Drake Peterson – percussion, trumpet (2017–present)

Former members
Kai Rediske – vocals, percussion (2004–2013)
Catlin Peterson – vocals, guitar
Joseph King – dub controls, live sound

Discography

Studio Albums

EPs & Live Albums

Singles

References
Caulfield, Keith. Billboard – The International Newsweekly of Music, Video and Home Entertainment125.27 (Jul 20, 2013): 44.

Musical groups from Hawaii
Reggae rock groups
American reggae musical groups
Musical groups from California